Andrew O'Shaughnessy may refer to:

 Andrew O'Shaughnessy (politician) (1866–1956), Irish politician and businessman, independent TD for Cork Borough 1923–1927
 Andrew O'Shaughnessy (historian) (born 1959), British historian
 Andrew O'Shaughnessy (hurler) (born 1984), Irish hurler for Kilmallock Limerick